Nikolay Matveyevich Goloded (21 May 1894 – 21 June 1937) was a Belarusian Soviet statesman and first secretary of the Byelorussian Soviet Socialist Republic from December 1925 to May 1927. He served as a Prime Minister of the Byelorussian Soviet Socialist Republic from 1927 to 30 May 1937.

Biography 
Goloded was born into a family of Belarusian peasants, and graduated from the Byelorussian Agricultural Institute.

After working in various professions he became involved in the revolutionary movement and joined the Russian Social Democratic Labour Party (Bolsheviks) in 1917 and was involved in the Southwestern Front. 

From 1921 to 1924 he was secretary of the Gorki Regional Committee and in 1924 became a member of the Provisional Bureau of the Communist Party of Byelorussia and later on its second secretary from 1924 to 1927.

From 1927 to 1937 he was Chairman of the Council of People's Commissars of the Byelorussian Soviet Socialist Republic. 

He was arrested on 14 June 1937 during the Great Purge and jumped out of the window 5th floor of the Belarusian NKVD building to his death during his NKVD interrogation.

Notes

References 

1894 births
1937 suicides
People from Bryansk Oblast
People from Chernigov Governorate
Bolsheviks
Heads of the Communist Party of Byelorussia
Great Purge victims from Russia
Suicides by jumping in Belarus
Soviet rehabilitations